"Del Otro Lado" is the fourth single released by Argentine singer and actress Lali Espósito, taken from her debut studio album A Bailar (2014). It was released via digital download on January 7, 2015. The song was written by Espósito along with music producers Pablo Akselrad, Luis Burgio and Gustavo Novello, and was produced by 3musica, Hook Producciones S.R.L and Sony Music.

Background and release
The song was released for the first time on October 4, 2013, as a promotional single from the album. The track was also released on March 21, 2014, as part of the entire album. On January 7, 2015, the song was released as an official single by uploading the lyric video for it.

Live performances
Espósito gave her first live performance of "Del Otro Lado" on her solo artist release at La Trastienda on September 2, 2013. On June 2, 2014, Espósito performed the song at "The U-Mix Show". "Del Otro Lado" is also part of the setlist for Espósito's worldwide tour, A Bailar Tour.

Music video
The video was released on Espósito's VEVO channel on March 10, 2015. Previously, a lyric video was released on January 7, 2015, and also, two teasers. Espósito posted preview clips of the music video onto her YouTube channel before the music video release.

Awards and nominations
The song won in the category for "Latin Song of the Summer" at the 2015 Latin Music Italian Awards.

References

2014 songs
Lali Espósito songs
2015 singles
Sony Music singles
Songs written by Gustavo Novello
Songs written by Pablo Akselrad
Songs written by Lali Espósito